The 1989–90 Alpha Ethniki was the 54th season of the highest football league of Greece. The season began on 17 September 1989 and ended on 27 May 1990. Panathinaikos won their 15th Greek title and their first one in four years.

The point system was: Win: 2 points - Draw: 1 point.

League table

Results

Top scorers

External links
Official Greek FA Site
RSSSF
Greek SuperLeague official Site
SuperLeague Statistics

Alpha Ethniki seasons
Greece
1